Hunlen Falls is a waterfall located at the mouth of Turner Lake in the Pacific Ranges of British Columbia, Canada.

Name origin
The falls were named in 1947 after a Chilcotin Chief named Hana-lin, who used to fish below the falls in the autumn with a fish trap, and trap game nearby. In the 1930s it was sometimes called Mystery Falls and before that occasionally called Bella Coola Falls.

Structure
Hunlen Falls drops  at a 90 degree pitch from the north end of Turner Lake via Hunlen Creek into the Atnarko River, a tributary of the Bella Coola River. Erosion of the canyon below Hunlen Falls has created an alluvial fan into the Atnarko Valley.

Access 

There is no road to Hunlen Falls. The easiest access is by float plane from Nimpo Lake, about a 20-minute flight. Planes land on Turner Lake above Hunlen Falls and the walk on a good trail takes about 30 minutes to the unfenced viewpoint on the east rim of the canyon. 

There is a hiking trail to Hunlen Falls, starting from Highway #20 at the foot of the Bella Coola Hill. Starting from Highway #20 the Tote Rd offers 4x4 access to the trailhead. The trail to Turner Lake is cleared and maintained by BC Parks and volunteers.

Nearby area 
The south end of Lonesome Lake was the site of the pioneer homestead of Ralph Edwards, known as "The Birches", which was occupied from 1912 into the 1970s. His life was made famous by the book Crusoe of Lonesome Lake.

In July 2004 lightning struck the ridge between Turner and Lonesome Lake, igniting what has become known as the Atnarko fire which burned into August. It burned the southern side of Turner Lake up to the falls, as well as destroying a number of residences including the Edwards and Turner homesteads.

See also
List of waterfalls in Canada

References

External links

Photos of Hunlen Falls
Hunlen Falls/Turner Lake Trail Map, BC Parks
Hunlen Falls/Turner Lake Trail Brochure, BC Parks

Waterfalls of British Columbia
Landforms of the Chilcotin
Pacific Ranges
Range 3 Coast Land District